Phaung Taw Oo Pagoda (also known as Hpaung Daw Oo) is a historical Buddhist stupa located in Lewe Township, Naypyidaw Union Territory, Myanmar. It features a cave-like design with a series of terraces. Another stupa, Moe-Kaung Pagoda, is nearby.

Sayadaw U Dama and Kon Nga Yar Khaing Sayadaw funded the construction and maintenance of the pagoda. The annual Hta-Ma-Nhae-Pwe festival, celebrated on Full Moon Day in the month of Tabodwe (roughly September - October), is held here. The festivities last twenty days as four images of the Buddha are transported through the city by longboat; the boats are rowed using a technique which maximizes endurance. A fifth image of the Buddha is left at the pagoda to act as guardian while the festivities take place. Rowing competitions are also held.

References

 Buddhist pilgrimage sites in Myanmar
 Tourist attractions in Myanmar
 Buildings and structures in Myanmar
 History of Myanmar